LastPass is a password manager distributed in subscription form as well as a freemium model with limited functionality. The standard version of LastPass comes with a web interface, but also includes plugins for various web browsers and apps for many smartphones. It also includes support for bookmarklets. GoTo (formerly LogMeIn Inc.) acquired LastPass in October 2015. On December 14, 2021, GoTo announced that LastPass would be made into a separate company and accelerate its release timeline.

LastPass suffered significant security incidents between 2011 and 2022. Notably, in late 2022, user data, billing information, and vaults (with some fields encrypted and others not) were breached, leading many security professionals to call for users to change all their passwords and switch to other password managers.

Overview 
A user's content in LastPass, including passwords and secure notes, is protected by one master password. The content is synchronized to any device the user uses the LastPass software or app extensions on. Information is encrypted with AES-256 encryption with PBKDF2 SHA-256, salted hashes, and the ability to increase password iterations value. Encryption and decryption takes place at the device level.

LastPass has a form filler that automates password entering and form filling, and it supports password generation, site sharing and site logging, and two-factor authentication. LastPass supports two-factor authentication via various methods including the LastPass Authenticator app for mobile phones as well as others including YubiKey. LastPass is available as an extension to many web browsers, including Google Chrome,  Mozilla Firefox, Apple Safari, Microsoft Edge, Vivaldi, and Opera. It also has apps available for smartphones running the Android, iOS, or Windows Phone operating systems. The apps have offline functionality. Note that LastPass shuts off the Google Chrome browser setting allowing the user to automatically save pass words in the browser. [see https://support.google.com/chrome/a/thread/7312208/how-do-i-change-offer-to-save-password-bar-when-it-s-locked?hl=en]

Unlike some other major password managers, LastPass offers a user-set password hint, allowing access when the master password is missing.

History 
On December 2, 2010, it was announced that LastPass had acquired Xmarks, a web browser extension that enabled password synchronization between browsers. The acquisition meant the survival of Xmarks, which had financial troubles, and although the two services remained separate, the acquisition led to a reduced price for paid premium subscriptions combining the two services. On March 30, 2018, the Xmarks service was announced to be shut down on May 1, 2018, according to an email to LastPass users.

On October 9, 2015, GoTo acquired LastPass for $110 million. The company was combined under the LastPass brand with a similar product, Meldium, which had already been acquired by GoTo.

On February 3, 2016, LastPass unveiled a new logo. The previous logo, which prominently featured an asterisk, was the subject of a trademark lawsuit filed in early 2015 by E-Trade, whose logo also features an asterisk.

On March 16, 2016, LastPass released LastPass Authenticator, a free two-factor authentication app.

On November 2, 2016, LastPass announced that free accounts would now support synchronizing user content to any device, a feature previously exclusive to paid accounts. Earlier, a free account on the service meant it would sync content to only one app.

In August 2017, LastPass announced LastPass Families, a family plan for sharing passwords, bank account info, and other sensitive data among family members for a $48 annual subscription. They also doubled the price of the Premium version without adding any new features to it. Instead, some features of the free version were removed.

On February 16, 2021, LastPass announced that from March 16, free versions would be usable on only desktop or mobile devices, rather than both. Any user wishing to continue using both would have to pay for the premium (i.e. paid for) version. They would also discontinue email support for Free users at the same time.

On December 14, 2021, GoTo announced that LastPass will be established as an independent company

Reception 
In March 2009, PC Magazine awarded LastPass five stars, an "Excellent" mark, and their "Editors' Choice" for password management. A new review in 2016 following the release of LastPass 4.0 earned the service again five stars, an "Outstanding" mark, and "Editors' Choice" honor.

In July 2010, LastPass's security model was extensively covered and approved of by Steve Gibson in his Security Now podcast episode 256. He also revisited the subject and how it relates to the National Security Agency in Security Now podcast episode 421.

In October 2015 when GoTo acquired LastPass, founder Joe Siegrist's blog was filled with user comments voicing criticism of GoTo.  Web sites ZDNet, Forbes and Infoworld posted articles mentioning the outcry by existing customers, some of whom said they would refuse to do business with GoTo, and raised other concerns about GoTo's reputation.

In a 2017 Consumer Reports article Dan Guido, the CEO of Trail of Bits, called LastPass a popular password manager (alongside Dashlane, KeePass, and 1Password), with the choice between them mostly down to personal preference. In March 2019, Lastpass was awarded the Best Product in Identity Management award during the seventh annual Cyber Defense Magazine InfoSec Awards.

In February 2021, in response to LastPass limiting its free tier to one type of device, Barry Collins of Forbes called the change a "bait and switch" that makes free accounts "much less useful than they used to be" that "ruins" the free tier.

Security incidents

2011 security incident 
On Tuesday, May 3, 2011, LastPass discovered an anomaly in their incoming network traffic, then a similar anomaly in their outgoing traffic. Administrators found none of the hallmarks of a classic security breach (for example, a non-administrator user being elevated to administrator privileges), but neither could they determine the anomalies' cause. Furthermore, given the size of the anomalies, it was theoretically possible that data such as email addresses, the server salt, and the salted password hashes were copied from the LastPass database. To address the situation, LastPass took the "breached" servers offline so they could be rebuilt and, on May 4, 2011, requested all users change their master passwords. They said that while there was no direct evidence that any customer information was compromised, they preferred to err on the side of caution. However, the resulting user traffic overwhelmed the login servers, and company administrators — considering the possibility that existing passwords that had been compromised was trivially small — asked users to delay changing their passwords until further notice.

2015 security breach 
On Monday, June 15, 2015, LastPass posted a blog post indicating that the LastPass team had discovered and halted suspicious activity on their network the previous Friday. Their investigation revealed that LastPass account email addresses, password reminders, server per user salts, and authentication hashes were compromised; however, encrypted user vault data had not been affected. The company blog said, "We are confident that our encryption measures are sufficient to protect the vast majority of users. LastPass strengthens the authentication hash with a random salt and 100,000 rounds of server-side PBKDF2-SHA256, in addition to the rounds performed client-side. This additional strengthening makes it difficult to attack the stolen hashes with any significant speed."

2016 security incidents 
In July 2016, a blog post published by independent online security firm Detectify detailed a method for reading plaintext passwords for arbitrary domains from a LastPass user's vault when that user visited a malicious web site. This vulnerability was made possible by poorly written URL parsing code in the LastPass extension. The flaw was not disclosed publicly by Detectify until LastPass was notified privately and able to fix their browser extension. LastPass responded to the public disclosure by Detectify in a post on their own blog, in which they revealed knowledge of an additional vulnerability, discovered by a member of the Google Security Team, and already fixed by LastPass.

2017 security incidents 

On March 20, Tavis Ormandy discovered a vulnerability in the LastPass Chrome extension. The exploit applied to all LastPass clients, including Chrome, Firefox and Edge. These vulnerabilities were disabled on March 21, and patched on March 22.

On March 25, Ormandy discovered an additional security flaw allowing remote code execution based on the user navigating to a malicious website. This vulnerability was also patched.

2019 security incidents 

On Friday, August 30, 2019, Tavis Ormandy reported a vulnerability in the LastPass browser extension in which Web sites with malicious JavaScript code could obtain a username and password inserted by the password manager on the previously visited site. By September 13, 2019, Lastpass publicly announced the vulnerability, acknowledging the issue was limited to the Google Chrome and Opera extensions only; nonetheless, all platforms received the vulnerability patch.

2020 security incident 

On 6th of April 2020, a vulnerability was found, concerning the storage of the master password within the web extension. LastPass did not use the Windows Data Protection API, but stored the master password in a local file when the "Remember password" option is activated.

2021 third-party trackers and security incident
In 2021 it was discovered that the Android app contained third-party trackers. Also, at the end of 2021, an article at the site BleepingComputer reported that LastPass users were warned that their master passwords were compromised.

2022 Customer data and partially-encrypted vault theft 

In August 2022, A hacker stole a copy of a customer database, and some copies of the customers' password vaults.   The stolen information includes names, email addresses, billing addresses, partial credit cards and website URLs. Some of the data in the vaults was unencrypted, while other data was encrypted with users' master passwords. The security of each user's encrypted data depends on the strength of the user's master password, or whether the password had previously been leaked, and the number of rounds of encryption used.  Details of the number of rounds for each customer was stolen.  Some customer vaults were more vulnerable to decryption than others.

LastPass revealed this in a series of blog posts and reports from  August 25, 2022,  and notifying customers.  While in November 2022 LastPass assured users that passwords stored with the service were still secure, LastPass offered more comprehensive advice to individual customers and business users in March 2023.

The customer data included customers' names, billing addresses, phone numbers, email addresses, IP addresses and partial credit card numbers, and the number of rounds of encryption used, MFA seeds and device identifiers.  The vault data included, for each breached user, unencrypted website URLs and site names, and encrypted usernames, passwords and form data for those sites. According the reports, the stolen info did not include a plain text copy of the user's master password.   

The threat actor first gained unauthorized access to portions of their development environment, source code, and technical information through a single compromised developer's laptop. LastPass responded by re-building their development environment and rotating certificates.  The actor however used the information to target and hack the computer of a senior DevOps engineer, used a key logger to obtain that engineer's master password.  The actor then gained access to an encrypted corporate vault, which was shared between just four engineers. That vault contained keys to S3 buckets of the backups to customer files. The actor obtained the user database of August 14 2022, and several password vault backups taken between August 20 and September 16, 2022. 

LastPass's December report suggested that, if customers had selected a strong master password and elected, under the account's advanced settings, to uses the many thousands of rounds of PBKDF2-HMAC-SHA-256 encryption (600,000 iterations recommended by OWASP, as of 2023), it would take millions of years to decrypt the passwords. However, new customers prior to June 2012 had by default a single PBKDF2-HMAC-SHA-256 hash applied to their master password, with site usernames and passwords encrypted with the weak AES-ECB cipher mode.  The default iteration count that was later increased for new customers to 500 encryption cycles, then later increased to 5000.  By February 2018 the default for new customers was 100,100 iterations, a minimum master password length of 12 characters, and the stronger AES-CBC cipher mode employed.  Old customers using old defaults may not have had their encryption rounds increased, nor have been forced to use a long password.

Commentators expressed concerns that if a user's master password was weak or leaked, the encrypted parts of the customer's data could be decrypted. Initially, LastPass stated no action was necessary for the majority of its customers, but other sources recommended changing all passwords and vigilance against possible phishing attacks. Some sources criticized LastPass's response, and raised additional concerns over the number of rounds of encryption that were required.

A class-action lawsuit was initiated in early 2023, with the anonymous plaintiff stating that LastPass failed to keep users' information safe. Of particular concern in the lawsuit was the increased risk of the details being used in phishing attacks.

See also
 List of password managers

References

External links
 

Password managers
Cryptographic software
Nonfree Firefox WebExtensions
Internet Explorer add-ons
2008 software
Google Chrome extensions
Proprietary cross-platform software
2015 mergers and acquisitions